Ernst Geissler (3 August 1915 in Chemnitz, Saxony, Germany – 3 June 1989 in Huntsville, Alabama, United States) was a German-American aerospace engineer. After World War II, he came to the United States on 16 November 1945 as part of the Argentina group, Operation Paperclip.

Geissler became director of the Aeroballistics Division at NASA's Marshall Space Flight Center in 1960.

Geissler was the recipient of the NASA Certificate of Appreciation in 1973.
He was awarded the 1973 NASA Distinguished Service Medal.
He was elected a Fellow of the American Astronautical Society.

References

External links
 Ernst Geissler Collection, The University of Alabama in Huntsville Archives and Special Collections

1915 births
1989 deaths
German aerospace engineers
German emigrants to the United States
German spaceflight pioneers
NASA people
People from Huntsville, Alabama
Operation Paperclip
Engineers from Chemnitz